The 2015 French Super Series will be the tenth Super Series badminton tournament of the 2015 BWF Super Series. The tournament will be contested in Paris, France from October 20–25, 2015 and had a total purse of $275,000. 
A qualification will be held to fill four places in all five disciplines of the main draws.

Men's singles

Seeds

Top half

Bottom half

Finals

Women's singles

Seeds

Top half

Bottom half

Finals

Men's doubles

Seeds

Top half

Bottom half

Finals

Women's doubles

Seeds

Top half

Bottom half

Finals

Mixed doubles

Seeds

Top half

Bottom half

Finals

References

External links
 French Open at www.yonexifb.com

French Open (badminton)
French Open Super Series
French Open Super Series
International sports competitions hosted by Paris